Vojkov is a municipality and village in Benešov District in the Central Bohemian Region of the Czech Republic. It has about 500 inhabitants.

Administrative parts
Villages and hamlets of Bezmíř, Křenovice, Lhotka, Minartice, Podolí, Sledovice, Voračice and Zahrádka are administrative parts of Vojkov.

Gallery

References

Villages in Benešov District